Business routes of Interstate 5 (I-5) exist in both California and Washington. There are no business routes in Oregon as that state does not assign such designations for any of its Interstate Highways. However, Oregon Route 99 (OR 99) essentially acts as a business route for most of Oregon, along with OR 99W and OR 99E, which also has its own business route in Salem.

California
Interstate business routes in California are assigned by the California Department of Transportation (Caltrans), but are not maintained by Caltrans unless they overlay other routes of the state highway system. Local authorities may request route assignment from the Caltrans Transportation System Information Program, and all requests require approval of the executive committee of the American Association of State Highway and Transportation Officials (AASHTO).

Chula Vista business loop

Interstate 5 Business (I-5 Bus.) was a business route of I-5 in San Ysidro, Chula Vista, and National City. I-5 Bus. followed the original routing of US Route 101 (US 101) along Beyer Boulevard, Broadway, Harbor Drive, and Pacific Highway. The route terminated at I-5 at both ends.

The designation was assigned in the 1960s and removed in the 1990s.

San Diego business loop

Interstate 5 Business (I-5 Bus.) was a business route of I-5 in San Diego. I-5 Bus. followed the original routing of US 101 along Mission Bay Drive and terminated at I-5 at both ends. The designation was removed in late 2004 and early 2005.

Solana Beach

San Clemente

Irvine business spur

Interstate 5 Business (I-5 Bus.) is a business route of I-5, starting at I-5 in Irvine and ending at Barranca Parkway in Irvine, traveling via Jamboree Road. The spur intersects with State Route 261 (SR 261) adjacent to the northern terminus of the spur.

Glendale–San Fernando Valley business loop

Interstate 5 Business (I-5 Bus.) in Glendale, Burbank, and the San Fernando Valley was a business loop of I-5 that followed present-day San Fernando Road in the 1970s. Prior to the construction of I-5, San Fernando Road was an alignment of US 6 and US 99.

Coalinga

Woodland business loop

Interstate 5 Business (I-5 Bus.) in Woodland begins at I-5 exit 537, runs west on Main Street (County Route 22 [CR 22]), and then north on Pedrick Street (SR 16, CR E7, CR 98) to exit 540.

Arbuckle business loop

The route runs seamlessly north from the offramp to Fifth Street through downtown Arbuckle, then turns west onto Freeway Underpass Road to exit 567, while Fifth Street continues north as Frontage Road (CR 99W). Both interchanges are signed for "Frontage Road".

Williams–Maxwell business loop

Interstate 5 Business (I-5 Bus.) in Williams begins at I-5 exit 575, runs north on Husted Road, and then northwest onto Frontage Road and Old Highway 99W, which runs along the west side of a former Southern Pacific (SP) line, now part of Union Pacific Railroad (UP). Within downtown Williams, the route takes a reverse curve away from the tracks into Seventh Street where it intersects SR 20 Bus. but then returns to its previous trajectory before running under a bridge for SR 20, which has one connecting road between the two routes on the northwest corner. North of Williams, the route passes through the unincorporated community of Cortena, where it shifts from northwest to north. Entering Maxwell the road makes another slight shift away from the former SP line, but not as far away as in downtown Williams. It intersects Oak Street and Maxwell-Colusa Road (the main west–east road in Maxwell), and then shifts back to its previous trajectory at a mobile home park north of North Street. I-5 Bus. continues along the west side of the tracks until ending at a half diamond interchange with I-5 with only southbound offramp and northbound onramp at exit 588. Old Highway 99W simply continues northward as CR 99W.

Willows–Orland business loop

Interstate 5 Business (I-5 Bus.) is one of the longer business loops at  that runs between Willows and Orland, though most of the signage is as Historic Highway 99W. The route begins at exit 601 on CR 57 and turns east. The segment is merely  from the northbound onramp before turning north onto Old Highway 99W, running along the west side of the same UP line mentioned in Williams and Maxwell. The route follows the historic U.S. Route past a bridge over a canal where it becomes South Tehama Street, and then North Tehama Street at the intersection with West and East Sycamore Avenues. At the intersection of West and East Wood Street (Biggs-Willows Road) is SR 162, he first major intersection with the business route and the only one in Willows outside of its southern terminus. North of SR 162, the North Tehama Street name fades away as route makes a slight northeast curve where it crosses a railroad spur leading to a Johns Manville insulation plant and then curves back north again running closer to that UP line.

Leaving Willows, I-5 Bus. passes through farmland, interrupted briefly by communities like Bluegum, where it curves away from the tracks to run along Walker Creek, only to cross a bridge over that creek and resumes hugging the side of the tracks again. The next community is Artois, where it moves northwest further away from the old SP line than it was in Willows but still turns back north again. Continuing its journey through rural Glenn County, I-5 Bus. passes through Grapit, then crosses a bridge over another canal to enter Greenwood. The route begins moving closer through the tracks as it continues through rural land and returns to the tracks after CR 20. The road returns to more rural setting as it enters Orland where it becomes Sixth Street and edges away from the tracks for local buildings on the east side. The intersection of Newville Road and Walker Street is where I-5 Bus. encounters SR 32. Two blocks later, the road hugs the side of the tracks again, and the road runs under an arch at a short bridge over the Stony Creek Irrigation Canal immediately south of the intersection with Almond Way. The tracks curve to the northeast away from the route just before the bridge over Hambright Creek where the road enters Wyo and then runs over a longer bridge over Stony Creek. After passing CR 9 then CR 8 on the east side, the business route turns left onto CR 7, while the former US 99W continues northward as "Highway 99W".

Red Bluff business loop

It begins on I-5 at exit 647 (exit 647A southbound). The route runs along South Main Street (CR A8), on the west side of an old UP line until after the intersection with the driveway to Red Bluff Shopping Center where it curves to the northeast and crosses under a trestle for that line. The route maintains that northeastern trajectory until just before it crosses a bridge over Reeds Creek, where the name changes to Main Street.

At Oak Street and Antelope Boulevard, I-5 Bus. is joined by an overlap with SR 36. Two blocks north of there, northbound I-5 Bus. and westbound SR 36 has an intersection with Walnut Street (CR A7) the road that leads to Shasta College. Less than three blocks later, the backyard of businesses along the east side is a bend in the Sacramento River, and I-5 Bus. and SR 36 curve to the northeast just north of that bend at Dog Island Park. The routes run parallel to the former SP line again, but this time on the west side before approaching the intersection with Adobe Road. The northern terminus of SR 36 ends where that route heads west toward Fortuna, just before the bridge over Dibble Creek. The last intersection with both directions of I-5 Bus. is with Hess Road just before the route approaches the flyover interchange with I-5 at exit 651, which contains a southbound offramp and northbound onramp. The last intersection for northbound I-5 Bus. is with Via Del Roble just before the aforementioned onramp with I-5.

Cottonwood

Anderson–Redding

Dunsmuir business loop

Interstate 5 Business (I-5 Bus.) is a  business route of I-5 in Dunsmuir. I-5 Bus. followed the original routing of US 99 along Dunsmuir Avenue at exits 729 and 732, but it also has an additional interchange at exit 730, where it switches over from the east side of I-5 to the west side.

Route description
I-5 Bus. begins at a trumpet interchange at Dunsmuir Avenue. The first sites along the road are a gas station and convenience store, two motels, and a self-storage facility. The route winds through the mountains of the southern outskirts of the city, passing by the Dunsmuir Lodge motel. Between the intersection with Katherine and Hill streets, it runs alongside the Dunsmuir Cemetery, officially entering the city limits halfway though. The route runs between Dunsmuir City Hall on the west side and Siskiyou County Sheriffs Office just before entering the Dunsmuir Historic Commercial District between Cedar and Spruce streets.

Exit 730 is a partial diamond interchange on the northbound side where the off- and onramps do not connect to one another, and a southbound right-in/right-out interchange with a wide gap between the two ramps divided by the Sacramento River as well as Tauhindauli Park. North of the southbound offramp with exit 730, I-5 Bus. moves closer to the southbound lanes of I-5 and runs beneath the south end of Siskiyou Avenue which contains a bridge over both Dunsmuir Avenue and I-5. Near a local road named Scarlet Way, the road moves away from the interstate with mostly residential wooded surroundings. Across from the Castle Rock Water Company, Dunsmuir Avenue becomes Mott Road with a parking lot for the Hedge Creek Falls Scenic Area, while I-5 Bus. makes a right turn onto the north end of Siskiyou Avenue, and ends at a diamond interchange with I-5 at exit 732.

Mount Shasta business loop

Interstate 5 Business (I-5 Bus.) is a  business route of I-5 in Mount Shasta. I-5 Bus. followed the original routing of US 99 along South Mount Shasta Boulevard at exit 737 (mixed with SR 89 at exit 736) and North Mount Shasta Boulevard at exit 740. Many of the businesses along the route are Alpine and Scandinavian mountain-themed motels.

Route description
I-5 Bus. begins at exit 737 which has connecting ramps to and from exit 736 (SR 89). The first intersection along the road is with South Mount Shasta Boulevard, a frontage road connecting to SR 89, which also connects southbound drivers to northbound I-5 via SR 89. North of that intersection the street name for the business route is South Mount Shasta Boulevard, with remnants of the old road on the northeast corner of that intersection. The road starts out as a two-lane forest road, though sparse development begins to show up after the intersection with Church Street where the road turns straight north. At the Evergreen Lodge, the route curves to the northwest, where development can now be found on both sides. Though primarily consisting of commercial development including motels and restaurants, a few residences can also be seen along the road. The northwest trajectory continue through the intersection with Old McCloud Road then turns straight north at Ream Avenue replacing the trajectory for that street.

At a blinker light intersection with Mount Cloud Avenue and Chestnut Street, South Mount Shasta becomes North Mount Shasta and bends to the northwest again. The first intersection after this blinker light is West Lake Street (at City Hall) and East Lake Street, the former of which is CR A10, a route that joins I-5 Bus. for two blocks. The overlap ends at East Alma Street, and CR A10 makes a right turn. It is here that the road runs parallel along the east side of a former SP line, now part of UP, although it briefly moves away from the tracks between East Ivy Street and north of East Hinckley Street with the north end of Chestnut Street in between. Shortly after returning to the side of the tracks it encounters a railroad crossing of a spur leading to the south side of the mountain almost to McCloud. Shortly after passing by some industrial zoning, the remnant of an even older section of US 99 can be found at Ski Village Drive. After making a sharp curve to the west, the old section of US 99 is spotted again as Road Number 2M16, albeit cut off from I-5 Bus. as a dead-end street. The last intersection along the route is with Spring Hill Road, before I-5 Bus. finally terminates at northbound I-5, while southbound I-5 Bus. begins at a flyover interchange from exit 740.

Weed business loop

Interstate 5 Business (I-5 Bus.) runs along Weed Boulevard in Weed. Its southern terminus is at I-5 at exit 745. It then overlaps the southernmost segment of US 97 before overlapping SR 265 between US 97 and I-5 at exit 748.

Yreka business loop

It then overlaps with SR 3 along Main Street, another part of former US 99. I-5 Bus./SR 3 then turns east onto Montague Road to intersect with I-5 at its exit 776. I-5 Bus. terminates at I-5 while SR 3 continues onto Montague.

Oregon
Although Oregon has no official business routes of I-5, OR 99 essentially serves as a de facto one, running along a former routing of US 99.

Washington

Vancouver business loop

Interstate 5 Business (I-5 Bus.) was a business route of I-5 in Vancouver.

Castle Rock business loop

Interstate 5 Business (I-5 Bus.) is a business route of I-5 in Castle Rock. It is partially concurrent with State Route 411 (SR 411).

Chehalis–Centralia business loop

Interstate 5 Business (I-5 Bus.) was a business route of I-5 from Chehalis to Centralia.

The route was originally composed of two partial loops connected by a center leg. Each loop served a city, with the northern loop serving Centralia and the southern loop serving Chehalis. These were posted following the elimination of the US 99 designation along most of the route in 1964. The business loop was removed in the 1970s; however, in 1989, the Chehalis City Council voted to restore the southern half of the route, composing the center leg and Chehalis loop. The Centralia City Council was also planning to take up the issue; however, it is unclear whether a vote was held and signs were not restored to the northern half of the route. However, the Chehalis part of the business loop had its signage restored in 1989. The signage was removed completely in 2018 when the interchange with I-5 was reconstructed.

Olympia

Federal Way business loop

Interstate 5 Business (I-5 Bus.) was a section of former US 99 from Fife through Federal Way to Midway (near Des Moines) that was signed as a business loop in 1962. It is now part of SR 99.

Seattle

Everett–Marysville business loop

Bellingham

References

External links
 Interstate Business Routes @ Interstate-Guide.com: Business Route 5

B
05